Ri Jong-myong is a North Korean wrestler.

He represented North Korea at the 2010 Asian Games, but was defeated by Dauren Zhumagaziyev. He went on to represent North Korea at the 2012 Summer Olympics in the Men's freestyle 60 kg and stood 5th after losing to Yogeshwar Dutt of India 1–3.

References

1985 births
Wrestlers at the 2012 Summer Olympics
Olympic wrestlers of North Korea
Living people
Wrestlers at the 2010 Asian Games
North Korean male sport wrestlers
Asian Games competitors for North Korea
Asian Wrestling Championships medalists
21st-century North Korean people